Thomas M. Doherty (May 11, 1869 – September 21, 1906) was a corporal serving in the United States Army during the Spanish–American War who received the Medal of Honor for bravery.

Biography
Doherty was born on May 11, 1869, in County Cork, Ireland. After immigrating to the United States, he joined the army from Boston, Massachusetts in September 1891. He was sent to fight in the Spanish–American War with Company H, 21st U.S. Infantry as a corporal where he received the Medal of Honor for his actions. Doherty continued to serve in the army, being promoted to Drum Major, before he committed suicide on September 21, 1906, at Fort Thomas, Kentucky. He is buried in Evergreen Cemetery Southgate, Kentucky. His grave can be found in the US military lot in section 25.

Medal of Honor citation
Rank and organization: Corporal, Company H, 21st U.S. Infantry.
 Place and date: At Santiago, Cuba, 1 July 1898.
 Entered service at: Newcastle, Maine.
 Birth: Ireland. Date of issue: 22 June 1899.

Citation:
Gallantly assisted in the rescue of the wounded from in front of the lines and while under heavy fire from the enemy.

See also

List of Medal of Honor recipients for the Spanish–American War

References

External links

1869 births
1906 deaths
19th-century Irish people
Irish soldiers in the United States Army
United States Army Medal of Honor recipients
United States Army soldiers
American military personnel of the Spanish–American War
Irish emigrants to the United States (before 1923)
Burials in Kentucky
Irish-born Medal of Honor recipients
People from Newcastle, Maine
Spanish–American War recipients of the Medal of Honor
Suicides by firearm in Kentucky
1906 suicides